Elgin Township is a township in Plymouth County, Iowa in the United States. The township is named after.

The elevation of Elgin Township is listed as 1286 feet above mean sea level.

References

Townships in Iowa